The  was a diary of Kobayashi Issa, the title referring to the last days of his father. This is said to be the very root of Japan's I novel.

Synopsis
Kobayashi Issa  (1763–1828), one of the four great haiku masters of Japan, along with Matsuo Bashō, Yosa Buson and Masaoka Shiki, described the last days of his father in his diary, beginning when his father suddenly developed fever and became seriously ill and continuing until a week after his demise. The weakening father and conflicts between his step-mother, his brother-in-law and him were vividly described in a factual manner. However, the diary was intended for publication, and thus had some embellishments. The title given by Tsukasue Tsuyuka, became the established title.

Kobayashi Issa

One of the four great masters of haiku, Kobayashi Issa was the first-born son of a family in Kashiwabara, Province of Shinano (now part of Shinano-machi, Nagano Prefecture). Issa's mother died when he was three and he was cared for by his doting grandmother, but his life changed dramatically when his father remarried five years later. Relations with his stepmother were not good, and they worsened when a half-brother was born two years later. He was 14 when his grandmother died, and a year later his father sent him off to Edo (now Tokyo)to eke out a living for himself. He wandered throughout Japan, eventually returning home in 1801. Shortly after his arrival, his father suddenly fell ill, and the diary records what he went through during his father's final days.

About the diary
The diary was written by Kobayashi Issa on the back of sheets of Saitancho, or New Year's memorandum paper. It was passed down by generations of the descendants of Kubota Shunko, one of Issa's disciples. It was well bound with a title page by Ogihara Seisensui and preserved at Issa-kan, a museum related to Issa in Takayama-mura, Nagano Prefecture.

Evaluation
Ogihara Seisensui wrote that the diary, describing what happened in only 35 days, including the important event of his father's death, expressed strong emotions in every word and phrase. Everyday happenings—what he felt, what his father said—became very interesting and revealed Issa for the first time. While the diary portrays the last days of his father, at the same time, it also reveals Kobayashi Issa as a faithful child of his father, and constitutes a part of his autobiography. Issa cared for his father very sincerely, and what he wrote moved people to a great extent.

Notes

References
Ogihara Seisenrui, ed., Issa's Chichi no Shūen Nikki 1934, 1992, Iwanami Shoten
Maeda Toshiharu, ed., Issa's Chichi no Shūen Nikki Asakiku Haikaiji Shoroku, 1979, Benseisha
Maruyama Kazuhiko, ed., Chichi no Shūen Nikki Kansei 3-nen kikō, with modern translation, 1962,  Kadokawa Bunko
Oshoku Zuika, ed., Modern Japanese, Oraga Haru and Chichi no Shuen Nikki, 1987, Kōbundō

External links
http://www.kobayashi-issa.jp/

Diaries
Edo-period works
Edo-period diaries